Alarobia Vatosola is a rural commune in Analamanga Region, in the  Central Highlands of Madagascar in the district of Andramasina. It is located at 70 km south-east of Antananarivo. It counts a population of 14,777 in 2018.

Economy
The economy is based on substantial agriculture. 
90% of the population of the commune are farmers. The main crop is rice. The region is one of the main suppliers of foie gras in Madagascar.

References

External links

Populated places in Analamanga
mg:Alarobia Vatosola